Moosapet is a neighbourhood in Hyderabad, India, And also a part of Greater Hyderabad. Kukatpally Y junction is located in this area. It is administered as Ward No. 117 of the Greater Hyderabad Municipal Corporation.

Commercial area
Laxmi Narasimha Swamy temple,
Patidar building, an auditorium, is an old landmark in this suburb.

The German retail giant, Metro Cash & Carry is located here.

Transport
Moosapet is well connected by TSRTC buses and is home to its Kukatpally Bus depot.

References

Neighbourhoods in Hyderabad, India
Municipal wards of Hyderabad, India